I'm Bad Now is the third studio album by Canadian indie rock band Nap Eyes. It was released on March 9, 2018 under Paradise of Bachelors in the US and Jagjaguwar everywhere else.

Critical reception
I'm Bad Now was met with "generally favorable" reviews from critics. At Metacritic, which assigns a weighted average rating out of 100 to reviews from mainstream publications, this release received an average score of 77, based on 12 reviews. Aggregator Album of the Year gave the release a 75 out of 100 based on a critical consensus of 12 reviews.

Accolades

Track listing

Personnel

Musicians
 Nigel Chapman – vocals
 Josh Salter – bass
 Brad Loughead – guitar
 Seamus Dalton – drums

Production
 Howard Bilerman – engineer, mixer
 Mike Wright – engineer, mixer
 Josh Bonati – mastering

Release history

References

2018 albums
Jagjaguwar albums